Lunar water is water that is present on the Moon. Diffuse water molecules can persist at the Moon's sunlit surface, as discovered by NASA's SOFIA observatory in 2020. Gradually water vapor is decomposed by sunlight, leaving hydrogen and oxygen lost to outer space. Scientists have found water ice in the cold, permanently shadowed craters at the Moon's poles. Water molecules are also present in the extremely thin lunar atmosphere.

Water (H2O), and the chemicals related hydroxyl group (-OH), exist in forms chemically bounded as hydrates and hydroxides to lunar minerals (rather than free water), and evidence strongly suggests that this is the case in low concentrations as for much of the Moon's surface. In fact, of surface matter, adsorbed water is calculated to exist at trace concentrations of 10 to 1000 parts per million. Inconclusive evidence of free water ice at the lunar poles had accumulated during the second half of the 20th century from a variety of observations suggesting the presence of bound hydrogen.
 
On 18 August 1976, the Soviet Luna 24 probe landed at Mare Crisium, took samples from the depths of 118, 143, and 184 cm of the lunar regolith, and then took them to Earth. In February 1978, it was published that laboratory analysis of these samples shown they contained 0.1% water by mass. Spectral measurements shown minima near 3, 5, and 6 µm, distinctive valence-vibration bands for water molecules, with intensities two or three times larger than the noise level.

On 24 September 2009, it was reported that the NASA's Moon Mineralogy Mapper (M3) spectrometer onboard India's Chandrayaan-1 probe had detected absorption features near 2.8–3.0 μm on the surface of the Moon. On 14 November 2008, India released the Moon Impact Probe onboard Chandrayaan-1 orbiter to impact into the Shackleton crater which helped confirm the presence of water ice. For silicate bodies, such features are typically attributed to hydroxyl- and/or water-bearing materials. In August 2018, NASA confirmed that M3 showed water ice is present on the surface at the Moon poles. Water was confirmed to be on the sunlit surface of the Moon by NASA on October 26, 2020.

Water may have been delivered to the Moon over geological timescales by the regular bombardment of water-bearing comets, asteroids, and meteoroids or continuously produced in situ by the hydrogen ions (protons) of the solar wind impacting oxygen-bearing minerals.

The search for the presence of lunar water has attracted considerable attention and motivated several recent lunar missions, largely because of water's usefulness in rendering long-term lunar habitation feasible.

History of observations

20th century
Apollo Program
The possibility of ice in the floors of polar lunar craters was first suggested in 1961 by Caltech researchers Kenneth Watson, Bruce C. Murray, and Harrison Brown. Although trace amounts of water were found in lunar rock samples collected by Apollo astronauts, this was assumed to be a result of contamination, and the majority of the lunar surface was generally assumed to be completely dry. However, a 2008 study of lunar rock samples revealed evidence of water molecules trapped in volcanic glass beads.

The first direct evidence of water vapor near the Moon was obtained by the Apollo 14 ALSEP Suprathermal Ion Detector Experiment, SIDE, on March 7, 1971. A series of bursts of water vapor ions were observed by the instrument mass spectrometer at the lunar surface near the Apollo 14 landing site.

Luna 24
In February 1978 Soviet scientists M. Akhmanova, B. Dement'ev, and M. Markov of the Vernadsky Institute of Geochemistry and Analytical Chemistry published a paper claiming a detection of water fairly definitively. Their study showed that the samples returned to Earth by the 1976 Soviet probe Luna 24 contained about 0.1% water by mass, as seen in infrared absorption spectroscopy (at about  wavelength), at a detection level about 10 times above the threshold.

Clementine

A proposed evidence of water ice on the Moon came in 1994 from the United States military Clementine probe. In an investigation known as the 'bistatic radar experiment', Clementine used its transmitter to beam radio waves into the dark regions of the south pole of the Moon. Echoes of these waves were detected by the large dish antennas of the Deep Space Network on Earth. The magnitude and polarisation of these echoes was consistent with an icy rather than rocky surface, but the results were inconclusive, and their significance has been questioned. Subsequent computer simulations encompassing additional terrain suggested that an area up to  might be in permanent shadow.

Lunar Prospector
The Lunar Prospector probe, launched in 1998, employed a neutron spectrometer to measure the amount of hydrogen in the lunar regolith near the polar regions. It was able to determine hydrogen abundance and location to within 50 parts per million and detected enhanced hydrogen concentrations at the lunar north and south poles. These were interpreted as indicating significant amounts of water ice trapped in permanently shadowed craters, but could also be due to the presence of the hydroxyl radical (•OH) chemically bound to minerals. In July 1999, at the end of its mission, the Lunar Prospector probe was deliberately crashed into Shoemaker crater, near the Moon's south pole, in the hope that detectable quantities of water would be liberated. However, spectroscopic observations from ground-based telescopes did not reveal the spectral signature of water.

Cassini–Huygens
More suspicions about the existence of water on the Moon were generated by inconclusive data produced by Cassini–Huygens mission, which passed the Moon in 1999.

21st century
Deep Impact
In 2005, observations of the Moon by the Deep Impact spacecraft produced inconclusive spectroscopic data suggestive of water on the Moon. In 2006, observations with the Arecibo planetary radar showed that some of the near-polar Clementine radar returns, previously claimed to be indicative of ice, might instead be associated with rocks ejected from young craters. If true, this would indicate that the neutron results from Lunar Prospector were primarily from hydrogen in forms other than ice, such as trapped hydrogen molecules or organics. Nevertheless, the interpretation of the Arecibo data do not exclude the possibility of water ice in permanently shadowed craters. In June 2009, NASA's Deep Impact spacecraft, now redesignated EPOXI, made further confirmatory bound hydrogen measurements during another lunar flyby.

Kaguya
As part of its lunar mapping programme, Japan's Kaguya probe, launched in September 2007 for a 19-month mission, carried out gamma ray spectrometry observations from orbit that can measure the abundances of various elements on the Moon's surface. Japan's Kaguya probe's high resolution imaging sensors failed to detect any signs of water ice in permanently shaded craters around the south pole of the Moon, and it ended its mission by crashing into the lunar surface in order to study the ejecta plume content.

Chang'e 1
The People's Republic of China's Chang'e 1 orbiter, launched in October 2007, took the first detailed photographs of some polar areas where ice water is likely to be found.

Chandrayaan-1

India's ISRO spacecraft Chandrayaan-1 released the Moon Impact Probe (MIP) that impacted Shackleton Crater, of the lunar south pole, at 20:31 on 14 November 2008 releasing subsurface debris that was analysed for presence of water ice. During its 25-minute descent, the impact probe's Chandra's Altitudinal Composition Explorer (CHACE) recorded evidence of water in 650 mass spectra gathered in the thin atmosphere above the Moon's surface and hydroxyl absorption lines in reflected sunlight.

On September 25, 2009, NASA declared that data sent from its M3 confirmed the existence of hydrogen over large areas of the Moon's surface, albeit in low concentrations and in the form of hydroxyl group (OH) chemically bound to soil. This supports earlier evidence from spectrometers aboard the Deep Impact and Cassini probes. On the Moon, the feature is seen as a widely distributed absorption that appears strongest at cooler high latitudes and at several fresh feldspathic craters. The general lack of correlation of this feature in sunlit M3 data with neutron spectrometer H abundance data suggests that the formation and retention of OH and H2O is an ongoing surficial process. OH/H2O production processes may feed polar cold traps and make the lunar regolith a candidate source of volatiles for human exploration.

Although M3 results are consistent with recent findings of other NASA instruments onboard Chandrayaan-1, the discovered water molecules in the Moon's polar regions is not consistent with the presence of thick deposits of nearly pure water ice within a few meters of the lunar surface, but it does not rule out the presence of small (<∼), discrete pieces of ice mixed in with the regolith. Additional analysis with M3 published in 2018 had provided more direct evidence of water ice near the surface within 20° latitude of both poles. In addition to observing reflected light from the surface, scientists used M3's near-infrared absorption capabilities in the permanently shadowed areas of the polar regions to find absorption spectra consistent with ice. At the north pole region, the water ice is scattered in patches, while it is more concentrated in a single body around the south pole. Because these polar regions do not experience the high temperatures (greater than 373 Kelvin), it was postulated that the poles act as cold traps where vaporized water is collected on the Moon.

In March 2010, it was reported that the Mini-SAR on board Chandrayaan-1 had discovered more than 40 permanently darkened craters near the Moon's north pole that are hypothesized to contain an estimated 600 million metric tonnes of water-ice. The radar's high CPR is not uniquely diagnostic of either roughness or ice; the science team must take into account the environment of the occurrences of high CPR signal to interpret its cause. The ice must be relatively pure and at least a couple of meters thick to give this signature. The estimated amount of water ice potentially present is comparable to the quantity estimated from the previous mission of Lunar Prospector's neutron data.

Lunar Reconnaissance Orbiter | Lunar Crater Observation and Sensing Satellite

On October 9, 2009, the Centaur upper stage of its Atlas V carrier rocket was directed to impact Cabeus crater at 11:31 UTC, followed shortly by the NASA's Lunar Crater Observation and Sensing Satellite (LCROSS) spacecraft that flew through the ejecta plume. 
LCROSS detected a significant amount of hydroxyl group in the material thrown up from a south polar crater by an impactor; this may be attributed to water-bearing materials – what appears to be "near pure crystalline water-ice" mixed in the regolith. What was actually detected was the chemical group hydroxyl (OH), which is suspected to be from water, but could also be hydrates, which are inorganic salts containing chemically bound water molecules. The nature, concentration and distribution of this material requires further analysis; chief mission scientist Anthony Colaprete has stated that the ejecta appears to include a range of fine-grained particulates of near pure crystalline water-ice. A later definitive analysis found the concentration of water to be "5.6 ± 2.9% by mass".

The Mini-RF instrument on board the Lunar Reconnaissance Orbiter (LRO) observed the plume of debris from the impact of the LCROSS orbiter, and it was concluded that the water ice must be in the form of small (< ~10 cm), discrete pieces of ice distributed throughout the regolith, or as thin coating on ice grains. This, coupled with monostatic radar observations, suggest that the water ice present in the permanently shadowed regions of lunar polar craters is unlikely to be present in the form of thick, pure ice deposits.

The data acquired by the Lunar Exploration Neutron Detector (LEND) instrument onboard LRO show several regions where the epithermal neutron flux from the surface is suppressed, which is indicative of enhanced hydrogen content.  Further analysis of LEND data suggests that water content in the polar regions is not directly determined by the illumination conditions of the surface, as illuminated and shadowed regions do not manifest any significant difference in the estimated water content. According to the observations by this instrument alone, "the permanent low surface temperature of the cold traps is not a necessary and sufficient condition for enhancement of water content in the regolith."

LRO laser altimeter's examination of the Shackleton crater at the lunar south pole suggests up to 22% of the surface of that crater is covered in ice.

Melt inclusions in Apollo 17 samples
In May 2011, Erik Hauri et al. reported 615-1410 ppm water in melt inclusions in lunar sample 74220, the famous high-titanium "orange glass soil" of volcanic origin collected during the Apollo 17 mission in 1972. The inclusions were formed during explosive eruptions on the Moon approximately 3.7 billion years ago.

This concentration is comparable with that of magma in Earth's upper mantle. While of considerable selenological interest, this announcement affords little comfort to would-be lunar colonists. The sample originated many kilometers below the surface, and the inclusions are so difficult to access that it took 39 years to detect them with a state-of-the-art ion microprobe instrument.

Stratospheric Observatory for Infrared Astronomy
In October 2020, astronomers reported detecting molecular water on the sunlit surface of the Moon by several independent scientific teams, including the Stratospheric Observatory for Infrared Astronomy (SOFIA). The estimated abundance is about 100 to 400 ppm, with a distribution over a small latitude range, likely a result of local geology and not a global phenomenon. It was suggested that the detected water is stored within glasses or in voids between grains sheltered from the harsh lunar environment, thus allowing the water to remain on the lunar surface.  Using data from the Lunar Reconnaissance Orbiter, it was shown that besides the large, permanently shadowed regions in the Moon's polar regions, there are many unmapped cold traps, substantially augmenting the areas where ice may accumulate. Approximately 10–20% of the permanent cold-trap area for water is found to be contained in "micro cold traps" found in shadows on scales from 1 km to 1 cm, for a total area of ~40,000 km2, about 60% of which is in the South, and a majority of cold traps for water ice are found at latitudes >80° due to permanent shadows.

October 26, 2020: In a paper published in  Nature Astronomy, a team of scientists used SOFIA, an infrared telescope mounted inside a 747 jumbo jet, to make observations that showed unambiguous evidence of water on parts of the Moon where the sun shines. “This discovery reveals that water might be distributed across the lunar surface and not limited to the cold shadowed places near the lunar poles,” Paul Hertz, the director of NASA's astrophysics division, said.

Lunar IceCube
Lunar IceCube is a 6U cube sat that will estimate amount and composition of lunar ice, using an infrared imaging spectrometer developed by NASAs Goddard Space Flight Center.

PRIME-1
A dedicated on-site experiment by NASA dubbed PRIME-1 is slated to land on the Moon in June, 2023 near Shackleton Crater at the Lunar South Pole. The mission will drill for water ice.

Lunar Trailblazer
Slated to launch as a ride-along mission in 2025, the Lunar Trailblazer satellite is part of NASA's Small Innovative Missions for Planetary Exploration (SIMPLEx) program. The satellite carries two instruments—a high-resolution spectrometer, which will detect and map different forms of water, and a thermal mapper. The mission's primary objectives are to characterize the form of lunar water, how much is present and where; determine how lunar volatiles change and move over time; measure how much and what form of water exists in permanently shadowed regions of the Moon; and to assess how differences in the reflectivity and temperature of lunar surfaces affect the concentration of lunar water.

Possible water cycle

Production
Lunar water has two potential origins: water-bearing comets (and other bodies) striking the Moon, and in  situ production. It has been theorized that the latter may occur when hydrogen ions (protons) in the solar wind chemically combine with the oxygen atoms present in the lunar minerals (oxides, silicates, etc.) to produce small amounts of water trapped in the minerals' crystal lattices or as hydroxyl groups, potential water precursors. (This mineral-bound water, or mineral surface, must not be confused with water ice.)

The hydroxyl surface groups (X–OH) formed by the reaction of protons (H+) with oxygen atoms accessible at oxide surface (X=O) could further be converted in water molecules (H2O) adsorbed onto the oxide mineral's surface. The mass balance of a chemical rearrangement supposed at the oxide surface could be schematically written as follows:

2 X–OH → X=O + X + H2O
or, 
2 X–OH → X–O–X + H2O

where "X" represents the oxide surface.

The formation of one water molecule requires the presence of two adjacent hydroxyl groups or a cascade of successive reactions of one oxygen atom with two protons. This could constitute a limiting factor and decreases the probability of water production if the proton density per surface unit is too low.

Trapping
Solar radiation would normally strip any free water or water ice from the lunar surface, splitting it into its constituent elements, hydrogen and oxygen, which then escape to space. However, because of the only very slight axial tilt of the Moon's spin axis to the ecliptic plane (1.5 °), some deep craters near the poles never receive any sunlight, and are permanently shadowed (see, for example, Shackleton crater, and Whipple crater). The temperature in these regions never rises above about 100 K (about −170 ° Celsius), and any water that eventually ended up in these craters could remain frozen and stable for extremely long periods of time — perhaps billions of years, depending on the stability of the orientation of the Moon's axis.

While the ice deposits may be thick, they are most likely mixed with the regolith, possibly in a layered formation.

Transport
 
Although free water cannot persist in illuminated regions of the Moon, any such water produced there by the action of the solar wind on lunar minerals might, through a process of evaporation and condensation, migrate to permanently cold polar areas and accumulate there as ice, perhaps in addition to any ice brought by comet impacts.

The hypothetical mechanism of water transport / trapping (if any) remains unknown: indeed lunar surfaces directly exposed to the solar wind where water production occurs are too hot to allow trapping by water condensation (and solar radiation also continuously decomposes water), while no (or much less) water production is expected in the cold areas not directly exposed to the Sun. Given the expected short lifetime of water molecules in illuminated regions, a short transport distance would in principle increase the probability of trapping. In other words, water molecules produced close to a cold, dark polar crater should have the highest probability of surviving and being trapped.

To what extent, and at what spatial scale, direct proton exchange (protolysis) and proton surface diffusion directly occurring at the naked surface of oxyhydroxide minerals exposed to space vacuum (see surface diffusion and self-ionization of water) could also play a role in the mechanism of the water transfer towards the coldest point is presently unknown and remains a conjecture.

Liquid water

4–3.5 billion years ago, the Moon could have had sufficient atmosphere and liquid water on its surface. Warm and pressurized regions in the Moon's interior might still contain liquid water.

Uses

The presence of large quantities of water on the Moon would be an important factor in rendering lunar habitation cost-effective since transporting water (or hydrogen and oxygen) from Earth would be prohibitively expensive. If future investigations find the quantities to be particularly large, water ice could be mined to provide liquid water for drinking and plant propagation, and the water could also be split into hydrogen and oxygen by solar panel-equipped electric power stations or a nuclear generator, providing breathable oxygen as well as the components of rocket fuel. The hydrogen component of the water ice could also be used to draw out the oxides in the lunar soil and harvest even more oxygen.

Analysis of lunar ice would also provide scientific information about the impact history of the Moon and the abundance of comets and asteroids in the early Inner Solar System.

Ownership
The hypothetical discovery of usable quantities of water on the Moon may raise legal questions about who owns the water and who has the right to exploit it. The United Nations Outer Space Treaty does not prevent the exploitation of lunar resources, but does prevent the appropriation of the Moon by individual nations and is generally interpreted as barring countries from claiming ownership of Lunar resources. However most legal experts agree that the ultimate test of the question will arise through precedents of national or private activity.

The Moon Treaty specifically stipulates that exploitation of lunar resources is to be governed by an "international regime", but that treaty has only been ratified by a few nations, and primarily those with no independent spaceflight capabilities.

Luxembourg and the US have granted their citizens the right to mine and own space resources, including the resources of the Moon. US President Donald Trump expressly stated that in his Executive Order of 6 April 2020.

See also

 In situ resource utilization
 Lunar resources
 Shackleton Energy Company
 Water on Mars
Missions mapping lunar water
 Chandrayaan-1 lunar orbiter
 Chandrayaan-2 lunar orbiter and rover
 Lunar Flashlight solar sail orbiter
 Lunar IceCube lunar orbiter
 LunaH-Map lunar obiter
 Lunar Reconnaissance Orbiter

References

External links
 CubeSat for investigating ice on the Moon — SPIE Newsroom
 Ice on the Moon — NASA Goddard Space Flight Center
 Fluxes of fast and epithermal neutrons from Lunar Prospector: Evidence for water ice at the lunar poles — Science
 Moon has a litre of water for every tonne of soil — Times Online
 Unambiguous evidence of water on the Moon — Slashdot Science Story

Articles containing video clips
Water
Moon
Water